Simon Chan (born in New Orleans, Louisiana) is an American music video director.

Filmography

 Almost Sharkproof starring Jon Lovitz (2013)
 Dead Meadow - Three Kings starring Sean Michael Guess (2010)

Music video filmography

 Mature Science - Retox (2013)
 Isis - The Sword (2012)
 Spell Eater - Huntress (2012)
 8 of Swords - Huntress (2011)
 Creten - Saviours (2011)
 Can't Getcha Out Of My Mind - Deep Dark Robot (2011)
 The Widow - The Mars Volta (2005)
 Counting 5-4-3-2-1 - Thursday (2006) 
 Aotkpta - The Locust (2007)
 That Old Temple - Dead Meadow (2009)
 Three Kings - Dead Meadow (2010) 
 The Hair Song - Black Mountain (2010) 
 Tres Brujas - The Sword (2010)
 Lawless Lands - The Sword (2010)
 Night City - The Sword (2011)
 Confusion Range - Spindrift (2011) 
 Won't You Be My Girl? - Deep Dark Robot (2011)
 It Fucking Hurts - Deep Dark Robot (2011)
 Speck - Deep Dark Robot (2011)

References

External links
Artificial Army

Living people
Year of birth missing (living people)
Artists from New Orleans
American music video directors